Atemelia is a genus of moths of the family Plutellidae.

Species
Atemelia casimiroae Sohn et Epstein 2019
Atemelia compressella - Herrich-Schäffer, 1855 
Atemelia contrariella - Zeller, 1877 
Atemelia iridesma - Meyrick, 1930 
Atemelia mahonivora Sohn et Peralta 2014
Atemelia torquatella - Lienig, 1846

References
 

Plutellidae